Saroba pustulifera is a moth of the family Noctuidae first described by Francis Walker in 1865. It is found in the Indian subregion, Hong Kong, Thailand, Sundaland, Sulawesi and Sri Lanka.

Its forewings are distinctive with extensive whitish blotches basally and postmedially on the forewing.

References

Moths of Asia
Moths described in 1865